Manuel Monzeglio Velázquez (born 25 September 2001) is a Uruguayan professional footballer who plays as an attacking midfielder for Nacional.

Career
Monzeglio is a youth academy graduate of Nacional. He made his professional debut for the club on 26 November 2021 in a 2–2 league draw against Liverpool Montevideo.

Career statistics

Honours
Nacional
Uruguayan Primera División: 2022

References

External links
 
 Manuel Monzeglio at Atilio Software 

2000 births
Living people
Association football midfielders
Uruguayan footballers
Uruguayan Primera División players
Club Nacional de Football players